Tropidonophis dahlii, also known commonly as the New Britain keelback, is a species of snake in the family Colubridae. The species is native to Indonesia and Papua New Guinea.

Etymology
The specific name, dahlii, is in honor of German zoologist Karl Theodor Friedrich Dahl.

Habitat

Reproduction
T. dahlii is oviparous.

References

Further reading
Malnate EV, Underwood G (1988). "Australasian natricine snakes of the genus Tropidonophis ". Proceedings of the Academy of Natural Sciences of Philadelphia 140 (1): 59–201. (Tropidonophis dahlii, new combination, p. 169).
Sternfeld R (1913). "Beiträge zur Schlangenfauna Neuguineas und der benachbarten Inselgruppen ". Sitzungsberichte der Gesellschaft für naturforschende Freunde zu Berlin 1913: 384–388. (Tropidonotus hypomelas, new species, p. 386). (in German).
Werner F (1899). "Beiträge zur Herpetologie der pacifischen Inselwelt und von Kleinasien. I. Bemerkungen über einige Reptilien aus Neu-Guinea und Polynesien ". Zoologischer Anzeiger 22: 371–375. (Tropidonotus dahlii, new species, p. 373). (in German).
Werner F (1925). "Neue oder wenig bekannten Schlangen aus dem Wiener naturhistorischen Staatsmuseum (2.) Teil ". Sitzungsberichte der Akademie der Wissenschaften mathematisch-naturwissenschaftlichen Klasse 134: 45–66. (Tropidonotus melanocephalus, new species, pp. 47–48). (in German).

Tropidonophis
Reptiles of Indonesia
Reptiles of Papua New Guinea
Reptiles described in 1899
Taxa named by Franz Werner